Ameromyia modesta is a species of antlions from the Myrmeleontinae subfamily. The scientific name of this species was first published in 1943 by Banks.

References

Myrmeleontinae
Insects described in 1943